The Humbug Tour was a world concert tour by British indie rock band Arctic Monkeys in support of their third studio album, Humbug. Although Humbug was not released until 25 August 2009, the tour started with a series of shows in Australia and New Zealand in the January of that year, followed by a break for the band to put the finishing touches on the record. The tour then resumed in Poland on 2 July 2009. The band proceeded to tour through 2009 and into 2010, ending with 15 dates in April across the United States and Mexico.

Set list

The set list evolved over the duration of the tour, but primarily focused on songs from Humbug. Songs from Whatever People Say I Am, That's What I'm Not were primarily left out of the set, with "The View from the Afternoon", "I Bet You Look Good on the Dancefloor", and "Still Take You Home" being the only songs to regularly feature from the band's record breaking debut album. The set list was briefly modified to include "When The Sun Goes Down" and a snippet of "Mardy Bum" during the November 2009 European dates. "When the Sun Goes Down" also returned for select shows in 2010, but "Mardy Bum" did not.

Generally, the band opened each gig with a song from Humbug (either "Pretty Visitors" or "Dance Little Liar"), followed by "Brianstorm", "This House is a Circus" and "Still Take You Home".  The mid-part of the set list was commonly rotated but generally featured two songs from Whatever People Say I Am, That's What I'm Not, three songs from Favourite Worst Nightmare, seven from Humbug and a cover of Nick Cave's 1994 hit; "Red Right Hand". In addition, a B-side from the Humbug sessions would often make the set list (often "Sketchead" or "Catapult"), although Favourite Worst Nightmare B-side "Nettles" was included during the last US leg in Spring 2010. Following the last song of the main set (usually "Do Me a Favour" in North America and "Secret Door" in Europe), the band returned for a two-song encore.

The encore typically consisted of a new version of "Fluorescent Adolescent", which had been transposed to include a snippet of a different song (most commonly "Only You Know" by Dion or "Strange" by Patsy Kline), as well as standard closing number "505". Both songs in the encore were generally from the band's 2007 album Favourite Worst Nightmare as a few variations included either "If You Were There, Beware", or the aforementioned B-side "Nettles".

Songs performed

Whatever People Say I Am, That's What I'm Not
 "The View from the Afternoon"
 "I Bet You Look Good on the Dancefloor"
 "Dancing Shoes" (dropped after 26 January 2009)
 "Still Take You Home"
 "When The Sun Goes Down" (occasionally played)
 "From the Ritz to the Rubble" (dropped after 24 January 2009, played from 2 to 9 July 2009)

Favourite Worst Nightmare
 "Brianstorm"
 "Fluorescent Adolescent" (with snippets of "Mardy Bum", "Only You Know" by Dion or "Strange" by Patsy Kline)
 "Only Ones Who Know" (added on 2 July 2009, dropped after 28 September 2009)
 "Do Me a Favour"
 "This House Is A Circus"
 "If You Were There, Beware"
 "505" (added on 2 July 2009)

Humbug
 "My Propeller" (added on 1 August 2009)
 "Crying Lightning"
 "Dangerous Animals" (occasionally played)
 "Secret Door" (added on 2 July 2009)
 "Potion Approaching"
 "Fire and the Thud" (added on 28 March 2010, omitted on 6 April 2010)
 "Cornerstone" (added on 1 August 2009)
 "Dance Little Liar" (added on 14 September 2009)
 "Pretty Visitors"
 "The Jeweller's Hands" (played occasionally from August 2009 to March 2010)

B-sides
 "Da Frame 2R" (dropped after 30 January 2009, played from 2 July 2009 to 7 August 2009)
 "Nettles" (added on 28 March 2010)
 "Red Right Hand" (Nick Cave and The Bad Seeds cover) (occasionally played)
 "Catapult" (occasionally played from December 2009 to April 2010)
 "Sketchead" (added on 16 September 2009, dropped after 11 December 2009, played on 28 March 2010)
 "Joining The Dots" (added on 28 March 2010)

Others
 "Leave Before the Lights Come On" <small> (dropped after 24 January 2009, re-added on 2 July 2009, omitted on 1 August 2009, dropped again after 3 August 2009)

Tour dates

Personnel
Arctic Monkeys
Alex Turner – lead vocals, guitar, acoustic guitar, baritone guitar; keyboards (January–February 2009)
Jamie Cook – guitar, baritone guitar
Nick O'Malley – bass guitar, backing vocals
Matt Helders – drums, percussion, backing vocals
Touring musicians
John Ashton – keyboards, guitar, acoustic guitar, baritone guitar, percussion, backing vocals (July 2009–April 2010)
Guests
Josh Homme – vocals and tambourine on "Dance Little Liar" and "Pretty Visitors" (on Pappy and Harriet's Pioneertown Palace concert)

Notes

References

2009 concert tours
2010 concert tours